The women's 4 × 200 metre freestyle relay event at the 2008 Olympic Games took place on 13–14 August at the Beijing National Aquatics Center in Beijing, China.

For the first time since the event's inception in 1996, the Aussies smashed a new world record to overhaul the undefeated Americans for an Olympic title with a benefit of a sterling opening leg from Stephanie Rice. Starting the program's longest relay race with a remarkable Oceanian-record split of 1:56.60, Rice and her teammates Bronte Barratt (1:56.58), Kylie Palmer (1:55.22), and Linda Mackenzie (1:55.91) registered a gold-medal time of 7:44.31 to shave nearly six seconds off the previous world record set by their greatest rivals in 2007.

China's Pang Jiaying expanded her stretch over U.S. swimmer Katie Hoff with an anchor of 1:54.39 to deliver the foursome of Yang Yu (1:56.79), Zhu Qianwei (1:56.64), and Tan Miao (1:58.11) a superb Asian record time of 7:45.93, and a silver medal for the host nation. After a disappointing Olympic campaign, the U.S. team of  Allison Schmitt (1:57.71), Natalie Coughlin (1:57.19), Caroline Burckle (1:56.70), and Hoff (1:54.73) finally found the best form on the blazing anchor leg to end the race for the bronze in 7:46.33, finishing nearly four seconds under the old world record.

Italy's Renata Spagnolo (1:58.31), Alessia Filippi (1:56.68), Flavia Zoccari (1:59.80), and Federica Pellegrini (1:54.97) missed out the podium by over three seconds with a fourth-place time and a European record of 7:49.76. Meanwhile, the French quartet of Coralie Balmy (1:56.57), Ophélie-Cyrielle Étienne (1:57.95), Aurore Mongel (1:58.62), and Camille Muffat (1:57.52) occupied the fifth spot in 7:50.66. Earlier in the prelims, Muffat (1:57.32), Balmy (1:55.86), Céline Couderc (1:58.92), and Alena Popchanka (1:58.27), previously competed for Belarus in three Games, established a new Olympic record of 7:50.37 to close the session with a final top seed. Hungary (7:55.53), Japan (7:57.56), and Sweden (7:59.83) rounded out the field. For the first time in Olympic history, all eight teams finished the race under eight minutes due to the presence of technology suits.

Records
Prior to this competition, the existing world and Olympic records were as follows.

The following new world and Olympic records were set during this competition.

Results

Heats

Final

References

External links
Official Olympic Report

Women's freestyle relay 4 by 200 metre
4 × 200 metre freestyle relay
2008 in women's swimming
Women's events at the 2008 Summer Olympics